Wesley Horskins (born 1963) is an Australian former professional tennis player and Tennis Coach.

Horskins, an alumnus of Wesley College, Melbourne, was Victoria's top ranked junior in 1980. He twice reached the semi-finals of the Australian Junior Championships and won the Switzerland [Landquart] and Czechoslovakian {Bratislava] Junior Championships. He competed on the ATP circuit for six years and went on to attend Oklahoma State University, where he competed in the NCAA tennis. He relocated to Marbella, Spain where he lived and coached for two years before resettling back to Melbourne to form his own academy, Futures Tennis. Futures Tennis has won the Newcombe medals at the Australian Tennis Awards in three different categories: 2011 Hot Shots; 2012 Club Coach and 2015 Club/Centre. Wes is a Tennis Australia Master Club Professional and in 2022 was inducted into the Tennis Coaches Association of Victoria's Hall of Fame.

On the professional tour, Horskins had a main draw appearance at the 1982 Australian Open in singles and doubles and reached a best singles ATP world ranking of 398 and doubles 252. He also featured in qualifying draws at the Wimbledon and French Championships. Wes went on to play and win the 35 and over Australian Vets Championship and reached the quarter finals of the ITF World 35 and over Championships in Amsterdam 2000 whilst also representing Australia in the World Team Championships in 2000 and 2001.

References

External links
 
 

Living people
Australian male tennis players
People educated at Wesley College (Victoria)
Oklahoma State Cowboys tennis players
1963 births